Attention: Miley Live (stylized in all caps) is the third live album by American singer Miley Cyrus. It was released on April 1, 2022, by Columbia Records. Most of the album was recorded during her concert as part of the Super Bowl Music Fest at the Crypto.com Arena in Los Angeles on February 12, 2022, with the set list including songs from her albums Plastic Hearts (2020), Miley Cyrus & Her Dead Petz (2015), Bangerz (2013), The Time of Our Lives (2009), Breakout (2008), and Meet Miley Cyrus (2007), along with multiple cover songs. The album also includes two unreleased tracks—"Attention" and "You". Cyrus said the album was "curated by the fans for the fans".

Background
Cyrus announced the album at the end of her set at Lollapalooza Brazil in São Paulo on March 27, 2022. "You" was first performed by Cyrus during her Miley's New Year's Eve Party special in Miami on December 31, 2021, while "Attention" was teased during the Super Bowl Music Fest concert. The album was recorded in February 2022.

Music videos for "Attention", "We Can't Stop x Where Is My Mind?",  "Wrecking Ball x Nothing Compares 2 U", "Never Be Me", and "Like a Prayer" were released on March 27, 28, 29, 30, and April 1, 2022, respectively.

On April 25, 2022, Cyrus announced the release of the deluxe version of the album, which would include six additional songs, that are mostly part of her time at the Lollapalooza festival in Brazil and other shows in Latin America, and she comments on the addition of "Angels like You" at her concert in Colombia in gratitude due to the song reaching the number one spot on iTunes in that country and because her fans sang the song all night outside the hotel where she was staying in Bogotá.

Critical reception

Emily Swingle of Clash gave acclaim to Cyrus's versatile vocals, saying "Cyrus' voice is truly a force to be reckoned with, seamlessly fitting whatever genre Cyrus chooses to tackle. From the playful, country-hip-hop banger that is '4x4', to rap-heavy '23', to the bluesy, rich cover of Janis Joplin's 'Maybe', it seems like Cyrus can fit into just about any genre she gets her paws on." Pitchfork writer Dani Blum praised the album's covers, but questioned the inclusions of lesser songs from Cyrus' catalog like "23", saying "Cyrus sounds limp, drowned out by the constantly swirling siren that underpins the song. It's jarring to hear these songs now, and the appropriation baked into their legacy. For years, Cyrus clung to hip hop stylings and aesthetics, creating controversy after controversy, but here, she sounds barely committed to the Bangerz stretch of songs."

Track listing

Notes
All tracks are noted as "Live", except "Attention".
"Attention" is stylized in all caps.

Personnel
Musicians
 Miley Cyrus – lead vocals
 Anitta – featured vocals on 22
 Aaron Encinas – background vocals
 Ayotunde Awosika – background vocals
 Danielle Fleming – background vocals
 Joseph Ayotub – bass
 Stacy Jones – drums
 Jamie Arentzen – guitar
 Max Bernstein – guitar
 Michael Schmid – keyboards
 Demian Arriaga – percussion
 Steven Salcedo – saxophone
 Reginald Chapman – trombone
 Matthew Owens – trumpet

Technical
 Miley Cyrus – production
 Chris Gehringer – mastering
 Paul David Hager – mixing, engineering, recording
 Vish Wadi – engineering
 Craig Frank – editing, engineering assistance
 Cameron Manes – miscellaneous production
 Cody Clark – miscellaneous production
 David Jun – miscellaneous production
 Derek Purciful – miscellaneous production
 Evan Bovee – miscellaneous production
 Kyle Ronan – miscellaneous production
 Takyuki Nakai – miscellaneous production

Charts

Release history

References

2022 live albums
Miley Cyrus albums
Columbia Records albums